The Ambassador of the United Kingdom to Croatia is the United Kingdom's foremost diplomatic representative in the Republic of Croatia, and head of the UK's diplomatic mission in Zagreb.  The official title is His Britannic Majesty's Ambassador to the Republic of Croatia.

Croatia declared independence in 1991 during the break-up of Yugoslavia, and the United Kingdom recognised the new Republic in 1992.

Ambassadors
1992–1994: Bryan Sparrow
1994–1997: Gavin Hewitt
1997–2000: Colin Munro
2000–2004: Nicholas Jarrold
2004–2008: Sir John Ramsden, 9th Baronet
2008–2012: David Blunt
2012–2015: David Slinn
2015–2016: Ian Cliff (chargé d'affaires)
2016–: Andrew Dalgleish

References

External links
UK and Croatia

Croatia
 
United Kingdom